Kyle Chalmers,  (born 25 June 1998) is an Australian competitive swimmer. He is a world record holder in the short course 100 metre freestyle, 4×100 metre medley relay, and long course 4×100 metre mixed freestyle relay. He is the Oceanian and Australian record holder in the short course 50 metre butterfly and 50 metre freestyle.

At the 2014 Oceania Swimming Championships, Chalmers won the Oceania title in the 50 metre butterfly and 100 metre freestyle. He was the 2016 Olympic champion in Rio de Janeiro in the 100 metre freestyle, winning the gold medal in world junior record time. In 2018, he was Commonwealth Games champion in the 200 metre freestyle. He also won a gold medal in the 100 metre freestyle at the 2018 Pan Pacific Swimming Championships and a silver medal at the 2019 World Aquatics Championships in Gwangju in the 100 metre freestyle. He won his second Olympic medal in the 100 metre freestyle Olympic Games event at the 2020 Tokyo Olympics, winning the silver medal with a time of 47.08 in the final. In 2022, he won the gold medal in the 100 metre freestyle at the 2022 Commonwealth Games and the 2022 World Short Course Championships.

Background
Chalmers was born in Port Lincoln, South Australia. He is the son of former Australian rules football and  premiership player Brett Chalmers. He attended Immanuel College in South Australia.

2014–2015

2014 Oceania Championships

Competing as a 15-year-old at his first senior international swimming championships, the 2014 Oceania Swimming Championships in Auckland, New Zealand in May, Chalmers won the gold medal in the 50 metre butterfly with a time of 24.35 seconds, finishing three-tenths os a second ahead of silver medalist in the event Nielsen Varoy of New Zealand. He also won the Oceania title and gold medal in the 100 metre freestyle, swimming a time of 50.71 seconds in the final to finish less than two-tenths of a second ahead of second-place finisher Steven Kent of New Zealand. In his other individual events, he placed fourth in the 50 metre freestyle final, with a time of 23.48 seconds, and eighth in the preliminary heats of the 100 metre butterfly with a 56.96 before withdrawing from competing in the final. For his relay events, he won a gold medal as part of the 4×50 metre mixed freestyle relay, splitting a 23.26 for the second leg of the relay in the final, a silver medal leading-off the 4×100 metre freestyle relay in 51.65 seconds in the final, and a gold medal in the 4×100 metre mixed freestyle relay, splitting a 50.84 for the third-leg of the finals relay.

2014 Summer Youth Olympics
Later in the year, at the 2014 Summer Youth Olympics in August in Nanjing, China, Chalmers won three bronze medals, one in the 4×100 metre medley relay, one in the 4×100 metre mixed freestyle relay, and one in the 4×100 metre mixed medley relay, as well as placing fifth in the 4×100 metre freestyle relay, ninth in the 50 metre butterfly, eleventh in the 50 metre freestyle, fifteenth in the 100 metre freestyle, and not starting the 200 metre freestyle.

2015 World Aquatics Championships
On the first day of the 2015 World Aquatics Championships in Kazan, Russia in early August, Chalmers split a 47.92 for the second leg of the 4×100 metre freestyle relay in the prelims heats, helping achieve a thirteenth-place finish in 3:16.34. For his 47.92 split, he was selected to compete in the 4×100 metre medley relay heats. The eighth and final day, he improved upon that time, swimming a 47.86 for the freestyle leg of the relay to help qualify the relay to the final ranking second with a 3:31.86. For the finals relay, Cameron McEvoy substituted in for Chalmers and all prelims and finals relay team members won a silver medal when the finals relay placed second with a 3:30.08.

2015 World Junior Championships

Later the same month, at the 2015 World Junior Swimming Championships in Singapore in late August, Chalmers won three gold medals, three silvers medals, and one bronze medal, medaling in all seven events he competed in. On day one, in his first event, the 4×100 metre freestyle relay, he won a gold medal, splitting a 48.41 for the second leg of the relay in the final to contribute to the winning time of 3:17.39. For his second event, the 4×100 metre mixed medley relay, he split a 47.68 for the freestyle leg of the relay to help achieve a final time of 3:48.27 and win the silver medal. The third day, he helped win the silver medal in the 4×100 metre mixed freestyle relay in 3:28.59, splitting a 48.89 for the second leg of the relay in the final.

On the fourth day of competition, Chalmers swam a time of 22.19 seconds in the final of the 50 metre freestyle to win the gold medal, finishing 0.17 seconds ahead of silver medalist in the event Michael Andrew of the United States. Later in the same session, he won a silver medal as part of the 4×200 metre freestyle relay, splitting a 1:50.13 for the third leg of the relay to contribute to the finals relay time of 7:17.76. In his second to last event, on the sixth and final day of competition, he won the gold medal in the 100 metre freestyle with a Championships record time of 48.47 seconds, breaking the record of 48.87 seconds set by Pedro Spajari of Brazil the day before. Concluding the Championships, he won a bronze medal in the 4×100 metre medley relay, contributing a split of 48.38 for the freestyle leg of the relay to finish in 3:40.21.

2016–2018

2016 Summer Olympics

At the 2016 Olympic Trials, Chalmers qualified for the Olympics by finishing second in the 100 metre freestyle, behind Cameron McEvoy. He broke the junior world record with a time of 48.03.

At the 2016 Summer Olympics in Rio de Janeiro, Brazil, Chalmers became the first Australian to win the gold medal in the 100 metre freestyle since Michael Wenden in 1968, doing so in a new world junior record time of 47.58 seconds and finishing over two tenths of a second ahead of silver medalist Pieter Timmers of Belgium and bronze medalist Nathan Adrian of the United States. He had also swum the fastest time in the heats, with his 47.90 breaking his own junior world record. Additionally, he broke the world junior record he set in the prelims heats at 47.90 by swimming a 47.88 in the semifinals. In the 4×100 metre freestyle relay, he contributed to Australia taking a bronze medal, first splitting a 47.04 for the second leg of the relay in the prelims, then splitting a 47.38 for the second leg in the final. In the 4×100 metre medley relay final, he had the fastest split of the field with a time of 46.72, which helped the team to win the bronze medal. Historically only Pieter van den Hoogenband (46.70 in 2003) and Cameron McEvoy (46.60 in 2015) had been faster in textile swimwear.

2016 Swimming World Cup
Following the 2016 Summer Olympic Games, Chalmers competed in the 2016 Swimming World Cup, setting a world junior record in the short course 100 metre freestyle at the stop in Singapore in October with a time of 46.61 seconds. His time earned him the silver medal in the event, finishing second only to Vladimir Morozov of Russia by 0.69 seconds. Four days later, at the World Cup stop in Tokyo, Japan, he lowered the world junior record in the short course 100 metre freestyle to a time of 46.12 seconds. This time Chalmers narrowly edged out Vladimir Morozov for the gold medal, finishing 0.03 seconds ahead of him.

2018 Commonwealth Games

In the 200 metre freestyle on the second day of the 2018 Commonwealth Games in Gold Coast, Queensland in April, Chalmers won the gold medal with a time of 1:45.56, finishing 0.33 seconds ahead of silver-medalist in the event, Mack Horton also of Australia. Later in the same session, he won a second gold medal, anchoring the 4×100 metre freestyle relay in the final with a 48.25 to help achieve a final mark of 3:12.96. Two days later, he started off the finals session tying Chad le Clos of South Africa for the silver medal in the 100 metre freestyle with a time of 48.15 seconds, finishing thirteenth-hundredths of a second behind gold medalist Duncan Scott of Scotland. In the final of the 4×200 metre freestyle relay, he split a 1:46.47 for the second leg of the relay to win the gold medal alongside relay teammates Alexander Graham, Elijah Winnington, and Mack Horton in a Commonwealth Games record time of 7:05.97. On the final day of competition two days later, Chalmers won his fifth medal in his fifth event, contributing a split of 47.25 seconds for the freestyle leg of the 4×100 metre medley relay in the final to help win the gold medal in 3:31.04, which was a new Commonwealth Games record for the event.

2018 Pan Pacific Championships
At the 2018 Pan Pacific Swimming Championships in Tokyo, Japan, Chalmers won the gold medal in the 100 metre freestyle with a time of 48.00 seconds, narrowly winning over silver medalist in the event and fellow Australian, Jack Cartwright, who finished 0.22 seconds behind Chalmers. In addition to his gold medal, he won silver medals as part of the 4×200 metre freestyle relay and the 4×100 metre freestyle relay, a bronze medal in the 4×100 metre medley relay, and placed ninth in the preliminary heats of the 200 metre freestyle before withdrawing from competing in the b-final of the event.

2019–2021

2019 World Aquatics Championships
On day one of swimming competition at the 2019 World Aquatics Championships in Gwangju, South Korea, Chalmers won a bronze medal in the 4×100 metre freestyle relay, splitting a 47.06 for the anchor leg in the final to help achieve a mark of 3:11.22 after splitting a 47.98 in the prelims heats to help advance the relay to the final ranking fourth in 3:12.65. The following day, he placed 13th in the semifinals of the 200 metre freestyle with a time of 1:46.21. For the final of the 100 metre freestyle on day five, he swam a personal best time of 47.08 seconds and won the silver medal. The sixth day, Chalmers contributed a split of 1:45.37 for the second leg of the 4×200 metre freestyle relay in the final to help achieve a gold medal-win in a new Oceanian record and Australian record time of 7:00.85. In the final of the 4×100 metre mixed freestyle relay on the seventh day, he helped achieve a silver medal and new Oceanian and Australian national records of 3:19.97 in the event, splitting a 47.37 for the lead-off leg of the relay. Concluding the Championships on the eighth and final day of swimming competition, he split a 46.60 for the freestyle leg of the 4×100 metre medley relay in the final for a fifth-place finish in 3:30.42.

2020 Summer Olympics

Chalmers battled numerous injuries in the lead up to qualification for the Tokyo 2020 Olympics, which included undergoing surgery to his shoulder as well as his heart. On the flip side, Chalmers set an Oceanian record and Australian record in the 50 metre freestyle at 20.74 seconds between surgeries, though the record was in short course meters and the Olympic Games were conducted in long course metres. Despite the troublesome preparation, he qualified fastest for the men's 200 metre freestyle in the Australian Olympic swimming trials after recording a time of 1:45.48. His win marked his third-consecutive national title in the 200 metre freestyle. Chalmers then backed up that performance with a strong showing in the men's 100 metre freestyle, delivering his fastest time in two years of 47.59 seconds.

In Tokyo, Japan at the 2020 Summer Olympics, held in 2021 due to the COVID-19 pandemic, Chalmers competed in the 4×100 metre freestyle relay, 4×200 metre freestyle relay, 100 metre freestyle, 4×100 metre medley relay and won one silver medal and two bronze medals. For his first race of the 2020 Olympics, Chalmers anchored the Australian men's relay team to help win the bronze medal in the final of the 4×100 metre freestyle relay, where his split of 46.44 seconds was the fifth-fastest freestyle leg of all time. In his second event, the 4×200 metre freestyle relay, Chalmers helped the Australian relay team secure the bronze medal in the final, with the relay touching third just 0.03 seconds after the second place relay team from Russia and a little over three seconds after the gold medal winning relay team from Great Britain. He equalled his personal best time of 47.08 seconds in the final of the 100 metre freestyle, finishing 0.06 seconds behind Caeleb Dressel of the United States, 0.36 seconds ahead of Kliment Kolesnikov of Russia, and 0.64 seconds ahead of Maxime Grousset of France to win the silver medal. Bringing his competition to a close at the 2020 Olympic Games, Chalmers anchored the 4×100 metre medley relay both in the prelims and the finals, helping the relay place fifth with his split of 46.96 seconds in the final.

2021 Swimming World Cup

Stop 1: Berlin

Embarking on the 2021 FINA Swimming World Cup, Chalmers started competing at the first stop, conducted in short course metres in Berlin, Germany, where he was named as one of the Australian stars to watch during competition by SwimSwam and FINA. In advance of competition, FINA also featured a picture of Chalmers with his silver medal from the 100 metre freestyle at the 2020 Summer Olympics on their website, highlighting him as one of the star athletes to compete in the World Cup circuit. The first day of competition, 1 October, Chalmers won the gold medal in the 50 metre freestyle with a time of 21.01 seconds in the final. His swim stopped the 29-consecutive-race and four-year-long winning streak in the 50 metre freestyle at the Swimming World Cup by Vladimir Morozov of Russia, meaning Chalmers was the first male other than Morozov to win the 50 metre freestyle in the last 30 occurrences of the race at the World Cup. Day two, Chalmers finished less than two seconds ahead of Jesse Puts of the Netherlands and Blake Pieroni of the United States to secure the gold medal in the 100 metre freestyle with his time of 45.73 seconds. Come the final day of competition in Berlin, Chalmers swam a personal best time of 1:40.82 in the 200 metre freestyle, dropping over six tenths of a second off his previous best time of 1:41.50 and winning the silver medal in the event. His swim was two hundredths of a second slower than the Oceanian and Australian records of 1:40.80 in the event.

Stop 2: Budapest

Following his success at the Berlin stop, Chalmers decided to continue on the World Cup circuit, competing at the second stop in Budapest, Hungary where Swimming World and FINA noted him as a competitor to watch in the 100 metre freestyle race. On 7 October, day one of competition, Chalmers was the only swimmer to swim sub-21 seconds in the 50 metre freestyle final, finishing in a time of 20.97 seconds to win the gold medal. The next day, he swam a personal best time of 45.50 seconds in the 100 metre freestyle, touching the wall less than two seconds ahead of silver medalist Vladimir Morozov and bronze medalist Kristóf Milák of Hungary and just four hundredths of a second away from the Oceanian record and Australian national record of 45.46 seconds set in 2009 by Matthew Abood. His swim was the top-scoring result out all of the day's performances based on the scoring system used by FINA to assign point values to each swimmer's result for a given race, coming to a total of 963 points for his 45.50 seconds. In the prelims of the 200 metre freestyle on the third and final day of competition, Chalmers ranked first with a time of 1:43.62 and qualified for the final in the evening. Chalmers finished second in the final, touching in at 1:41.60 to win the silver medal.

Stop 3: Doha

Continuing his World Cup quest, Chalmers was announced on 16 October by Swimming World as one of the headliner stars entered to compete in Doha, Qatar at the third World Cup stop starting on 21 October. For the stop, he decided to give the three sprint freestyle events a third go, entering to compete in the 50 metre freestyle, 100 metre freestyle, and 200 metre freestyle races. In the morning prelims heats of the 50 metre freestyle on day one of competition, Chalmers qualified for the final ranked second overall with a time of 21.26 seconds. He lowered his time from the prelims to a 21.02 in the final, fast enough to snatch up the silver medal in the race, while Vladimir Morozov won his first gold medal of the year's World Cup in 20.89 seconds.

The second day of competition, Chalmers swam his way to the final of the 100 metre freestyle with a time of 47.55 and an overall third place ranking in the morning prelims. In the evening he dropped over four tenths of a second off his previous best time, swimming a 45.03 and winning the gold medal. He finished over one second ahead of second place finisher Vladimir Morozov, who previously swam the second fastest time in history in 2018 with a time of 44.95 seconds. His time of 45.03 ranked as the third fastest swim in history, set new Oceanian, Commonwealth, and Australian national records in the event, and was less than one tenth of a second off the world record set by Amaury Leveaux of France in 2008 at 44.94 seconds. The new records broke those set by Australian Matthew Abood approximately 12 years earlier at the 2009 FINA Swimming World Cup.

Ahead of day three, Chalmers added an event to his competition schedule, the 50 metre butterfly to be contested the third day, and withdrew from competing in the 200 metre freestyle. Come prelims time for the 50 metre butterfly on the third and final day of competition in Doha, Chalmers swam a 22.83, lowering his best time of 23.72 from 2016 by almost a second, and qualifying for the final ranked first by five hundredths of a second ahead of Tom Shields of the United States and Jesse Puts. In the final, he bettered his own personal best time again with a time of 22.24 seconds, winning the silver medal and breaking the Oceanian and Australian records in the event set by Matt Jaukovic at 22.28 seconds over 12 years earlier in August 2009.

Stop 4: Kazan

Leading up to the fourth and final stop of the World Cup circuit, held in Kazan, Russia at the Palace of Water Sports, Chalmers was noted by FINA as someone to watch in the freestyle races, especially in competition against some of the home country competitors including Vladimir Morozov and Kliment Kolesnikov. Chalmers opened fast in the prelims heats on day one of competition, 28 October, swimming a 21.15 in the 50 metre freestyle to advance to the final ranked first, fastest, overall. He set new Oceanian and Australian records in the final, as well as winning the gold medal, with his time of 20.68 seconds, lowering his own record in the event from 2019 and finishing just ahead of Vladimir Morozov, who swam a 20.81.

The second morning of competition, Chalmers had another speedy start, finishing ranked first in the prelims heats of the 100 metre freestyle with a time of 46.74 seconds. In the final, he set a new world record and World Cup record in the short course 100 metre freestyle with a time of 44.84 seconds, winning the gold medal and finishing over one second ahead of silver medalist Vladimir Morozov. With his new world record and his time of 45.03 from Doha, he claimed two of the four fastest swims in history in the event. His time of 44.84 seconds lowered the former world record, set over a dozen years earlier in 2008 by Amaury Leveaux of France, by exactly one tenth of a second. It was the first world record set in the year's World Cup circuit.

Going all-in on racing Vladimir Morozov on day three, Chalmers made it three-for-three by racing the Russian in the 50 metre butterfly, finishing with a time of 22.93 seconds in the prelims heats that ranked him sixth overall, just behind Vladimir Morozov who tied for fourth with a time of 22.87 seconds. Wrapping up his competition for the stop and the circuit, he won the bronze medal in the final of the 50 metre butterfly with a time of 22.33 seconds, finishing 0.35 seconds ahead of Vladimir Morozov who placed fifth. The scores for his swims across all the stops of the 2021 World Cup circuit came to a total of 219.8 points, earning him fourth-place for overall points scored by a male competitor and finishing within eight points of the highest scoring male competitor. He was fifth amongst male competitors in term of total medal count, winning a total of twelve medals, seven gold, four silver, and one bronze.

2021 World Short Course Championships
In early November, Chalmers was announced as one of two Australians, and the only male Australian, entered to compete at the 2021 World Short Course Championships in Abu Dhabi, United Arab Emirates in December. Chalmers being announced as one of the two Australian team members for the World Championships ranked as number four for the Swimming World "The Week That Was" honour the week of 8 November 2021, three spots behind Ilya Shymanovich of Belarus and Szebasztián Szabó of Hungary who tied for number one after equalling the world record in the short course 50 metre breaststroke and 50 metre butterfly respectively. Less than two weeks before the start of competition, Chalmers withdrew from the Championships due to an ongoing shoulder injury. The week of the start of the Championships, the week of 16 December, Chalmers underwent a successful surgery for his shoulder.

2022

2022 Australian Swimming Championships
Chalmers pre-qualified for the 2022 Commonwealth Games in the 100 metre freestyle, based on his silver medal-win in the 100 metre freestyle at the 2020 Summer Olympics, and entered to compete in the 50 metre butterfly and 100 metre butterfly at the selection meet for the Commonwealth Games, the 2022 Australian Swimming Championships in May. On the first day of the 2022 Australian Championships, he swam a 52.10 in the prelims heats of the 100 metre butterfly to qualify for the final ranking third. In the evening final, he won the silver medal in the event with a time of 51.67 seconds, finishing less than two-tenths of a second behind Australian record holder in the event, Matthew Temple, and qualifying for the Commonwealth Games in the event. Day two, he ranked first in the prelims heats of the 50 metre butterfly, qualifying for the final with a personal best time of 23.42 seconds, where he won the gold medal and national title with a personal best time of 23.21 seconds and qualified for the Commonwealth Games with the other top-three finishers, William Yang and Isaac Cooper. Chalmers was named to the team Australia rosters for both the 2022 World Aquatics Championships and 2022 Commonwealth Games based on his times and place-finishes.

2022 World Aquatics Championships

At the 2022 World Aquatics Championships, held at Danube Arena in Budapest, Hungary starting in June, Chalmers helped qualify the 4×100 metre freestyle relay to the final with a preliminaries relay overall ranking of second. Splitting a 46.60 for the anchor leg of the relay in the final, he helped win the silver medal with a time of 3:10.80, narrowly out-splitting the second-fastest anchor leg swimmer in the final, Kristóf Milák of Hungary, by less than three-tenths of a second. In the preliminaries of the 100 metre butterfly, he placed 22nd with a time of 52.70 seconds, ranking two spots behind Youssef Ramadan of Egypt who swam a 52.42. On the second-to-last day of competition, he split a 46.98 for the second leg of the 4×100 metre mixed freestyle relay in the final to help win the gold medal with a world record time of 3:19.38. Splitting a 46.89 for the freestyle leg of the 4×100 metre medley relay in the final on the last day, he helped achieve a fourth-place finish in 3:31.81.

2022 Commonwealth Games
The following month, Chalmers ranked first in the preliminaries of the 50 metre butterfly on the first day of swimming at the 2022 Commonwealth Games, advancing to the semifinals with a time of 23.45 seconds. He placed tenth in the semifinals, not qualifying for the final with his time of 23.65 seconds. Later in the same session, he won a gold medal in the 4×100 metre mixed freestyle relay, helping set a Games record of 3:21:18 in the final with a split time of 47.55 seconds for the second leg of the relay. The following day, he won a gold medal in the 4×100 metre freestyle relay, anchoring the finals relay to a finish in a Games record time of 3:11.12 with a split time of 47.02 seconds.

Day three, Chalmers swam a 48.98 in the morning preliminaries of the 100 metre freestyle, qualifying for the semifinals ranking sixth. In the semifinals, he ranked first with a time of 47.36 seconds, breaking the Games record of 47.98 seconds set by Brent Hayden of Canada in 2010, and qualifying for the final. He won the gold medal the following evening, finishing in a time of 47.51 seconds and less than eight-tenths of a second ahead of silver medalist Tom Dean of England and bronze medalist Duncan Scott of Scotland. The final day, he split a 46.86 for the freestyle leg of the 4×100 metre medley relay in the final, helping win the silver medal with a time of 3:31.88.

2022 Australian Short Course Championships
Later the same month, Chalmers won the gold medal in the 200 meter freestyle at the 2022 Australian Short Course Swimming Championships with a time of 1:40.98, sharing the podium with two Americans. The following day, he won the 100 metre freestyle with an Australian All Comers record time of 45.55 seconds, finishing over one full second ahead of silver medalist Justin Ress of the United States. Two days later, he won the 50 metre freestyle in a time of 21.06 seconds, finishing 0.23 seconds ahead of silver medalist Justin Ress and 0.30 seconds ahead of fellow Australian and bronze medalist Grayson Bell.

2022 Swimming World Cup
The first stop of the 2022 FINA Swimming World Cup, held beginning 21 October in Berlin, Germany, Chalmers won a silver medal in the 50 metre freestyle on day one, behind gold medalist Dylan Carter of Trinidad and Tobago, and a gold medal in the 100 metre freestyle on day two, finishing 0.50 seconds ahead of silver medalist Maxime Grousset with a 45.88. In his third event, he won the silver medal in the 200 metre freestyle, finishing in a time of 1:41.09, which was less than three-tenths of a second behind gold medalist Matthew Sates of South Africa. He ranked fifth amongst male competitors at the first stop with a score of 53.4 points for all of his events.

On the first day of the second stop, in Toronto, Canada, Chalmers rounded out the podium with Dylan Carter (gold medalist) and Brooks Curry of the United States (silver medalist) in the 50 metre freestyle, winning the bronze medal with a time of 21.10 seconds. The following evening, he won the gold medal in the 100 metre freestyle with a time of 45.52 seconds, sharing the podium with silver medalist Thomas Ceccon of Italy and bronze medalist Brooks Curry. Day three, he placed fourth in the final of the 50 metre butterfly with a time of 22.67 seconds.

Day one of stop three of three, held in November in Indianapolis, United States, Chalmers won the silver medal in the 50 metre freestyle, finishing 0.09 seconds behind gold medalist Dylan Carter with a time of 20.81 seconds, which was 0.13 seconds slower than his personal best time of 20.68 seconds. On day two, he won the gold medal in the 100 metre freestyle with a time of 45.55 seconds, which was 0.72 seconds faster than silver medalist Thomas Ceccon and 1.27 seconds faster than bronze medalist Drew Kibler of the United States. In the 200 metre freestyle on day three, he finished 0.19 seconds behind gold medalist Kieran Smith of the United States to place fourth in 1:41.97. His performances earned 152.1 points across all three World Cup stops, ranking him as the sixth overall highest-scoring male competitor for the 2022 circuit.

2022 World Short Course Championships

In September, following his performances at the 2022 Australian Short Course Championships, Chalmers was named to the Australia roster for the 2022 World Short Course Championships, which was held starting 13 December in Melbourne. Day one of competition, he split a 44.98 for the anchor leg of the 4×100 metre freestyle relay in the final, which was 0.14 seconds off his individual world record time of 44.84 in the 100 metre freestyle from October 2021, and helped win the silver medal in an Oceanian, Commonwealth, and Australian record time of 3:04.63. On the evening of day three, he won the gold medal in the 100 metre freestyle with a Championships record and Australian All Comers record time of 45.16 seconds, sharing the podium with silver medalist Maxime Grousset of France and bronze medalist Alessandro Miressi of Italy. A little over two hours later, he won a gold medal in the 4×50 metre freestyle relay, helping set new Oceanian, Commonwealth, Australian, and Australian All Comers records with his fellow finals relay teammates in a time of 1:23.44.

The fourth day of competition, Chalmers substituted for Flynn Southam on the 4×50 metre mixed freestyle relay in the final, leading-off with a 20.97 to contribute to a silver medal-win with a time of 1:28.03, which registered as new Oceanian, Commonwealth, and Australian records. For his second relay of the evening, he contributed a time of 1:40.35 for the second leg of the 4×200 metre freestyle relay to help set new Oceanian, Commonwealth, and Australian records with a finals relay time of 6:46.54, which earned the relay the silver medal and was 0.27 seconds faster than the former world record of 6:46.81 from 2018. The following day, he contributed a 20.48 for the freestyle portion of the 4×50 metre medley relay in the final to help win the bronze medal with an Oceanian, Commonwealth, and Australian record time of 1:30.81. Later in the evening, he placed seventh in his seventh final, the 50 metre freestyle, with a time of 20.92 seconds, which was 0.03 seconds ahead of eighth-place finisher Lewis Burras of Great Britain and 0.46 seconds behind first-place finisher Jordan Crooks of the Cayman Islands.

On the sixth and final morning, Chalmers swam the freestyle leg of the 4×100 metre medley relay in the preliminaries in a time of 46.09 seconds, helping advance the relay to the final ranking fifth with a time of 3:25.02. Splitting a 44.63 for the freestyle leg in the evening final, he helped win the gold medal and set a suite of records with a final time of 3:18.98, which included a world record, Championships record, Oceanian record, Commonwealth record, Australian record, and Australian All Comers record.

International championships (50 m)

 Chalmers swam only in the preliminaries.

International championships (25 m)

Personal best times

Long course metres (50 m pool)

Short course metres (25 m pool)

Swimming World Cup circuits
The following medals Chalmers has won at Swimming World Cup circuits.

World records

World junior records

Legend: h – heat; sf – semifinal

World records

Continental and national records

Long course metres (50 m pool)

Short course metres (25 m pool)

Recognition
2016 – Australian Institute of Sport Performance Awards – Male Athlete of the Year and Best Sporting Moment
2016 – Swimming Australia Awards – Olympic Swimmer of the Year and Golden Moment
2016 – South Australian Sports Star of the Year
2016, 2018 – SwimSwam Swammy Award – Oceania Male Swimmer of the Year
2016 – SwimSwam Swammy Award – Junior Male Swimmer of the Year
2019 – Swimming Australia Awards – Patron's Award
2019 – Australian Institute of Sport Awards – Finalist for Male Athlete of the Year
2021–2022 – SwimSwam – Top 100 (Men's): 2021 (#13), 2022 (#10)
2021 – Swimming World – The Week That Was: 1 November 2021 (#1), 8 November 2021 (#4)
2021 – FINA – Top 10 Moments: 2021 Swimming World Cup (#9)

See also
 List of Olympic medalists in swimming (men)
 World record progression 100 metres freestyle
 World record progression 4 × 100 metres freestyle relay (mixed)
 List of Australian records in swimming

References

External links
 
 
 
 
 
 
 Kyle Chalmers' page at agent W Sports & Media

1998 births
Living people
World record setters in swimming
World record holders in swimming
Australian male freestyle swimmers
Australian male butterfly swimmers
Commonwealth Games gold medallists for Australia
Commonwealth Games medallists in swimming
Medalists at the 2016 Summer Olympics
Medalists at the 2020 Summer Olympics
Olympic bronze medalists for Australia
Olympic bronze medalists in swimming
Olympic silver medalists for Australia
Olympic silver medalists in swimming
Olympic gold medalists for Australia
Olympic gold medalists in swimming
Olympic swimmers of Australia
People from Port Lincoln
People educated at Immanuel College, Adelaide
Recipients of the Medal of the Order of Australia
Swimmers at the 2014 Summer Youth Olympics
Swimmers at the 2016 Summer Olympics
Swimmers at the 2020 Summer Olympics
Swimmers at the 2018 Commonwealth Games
World Aquatics Championships medalists in swimming
Medalists at the FINA World Swimming Championships (25 m)
Swimmers at the 2022 Commonwealth Games
20th-century Australian people
21st-century Australian people
Medallists at the 2018 Commonwealth Games
Medallists at the 2022 Commonwealth Games